The Stjarnan women's football team is the women's football department of the Ungmennafélagið Stjarnan multi-sport club. It is based in Garðabær, Iceland, and currently plays in the Úrvalsdeild kvenna, the top-tier women's football league in Iceland. The team plays it home games at the Samsung völlurinn located in Garðabær. The team's colors are blue and white. Stjarnan has won the Icelandic championship four times and also the Icelandic Women's Cup in 2012, 2014 and 2015.

Current squad

Former internationals
  Iceland: Katrín Ásbjörnsdóttir, Gunnhildur Yrsa Jónsdóttir, Glódís Perla Viggósdóttir

  Italy: Marta Carissimi
  Jamaica: Donna-Kay Henry
  Mexico: Verónica Pérez
  Nicaragua: Ana Cate
  Serbia: Danka Podovac
  Trinidad and Tobago: Ahkeela Mollon
  Tunisia: Imen Troudi

Former non-international professional players
  Kate Deines, Kristen Edmonds, Beverly Leon

Record in UEFA Women's Champions League

a First leg.

Trophies
Úrvalsdeild kvenna   (4)
Winner: 2011, 2013, 2014, 2016
Icelandic Cup
Winner: 2012, 2014, 2015
Icelandic Super Cup
Winner: 2012, 2015

Managers
 Ásgeir Heiðar Pálsson (Apr 1, 1984 – Dec 31, 1986)
 Erla Rafnsdóttir (Jan 1, 1987 – Dec 31, 1987)
 Helgi Thordarson (Jan 1, 1990 – Oct 16, 1993)
 Örnólfur Oddsson (Nov 1, 1993 – Apr 16, 1994)
 Ásgeir Heiðar Pálsson (Apr 16, 1994 – Oct 1, 1994)
 Jón Óttarr Karlsson (Oct 1, 1994 – Oct 16, 1995)
 Ólafur Guðbjörnsson (Jan 1, 2014–Dec 2018)
 Kristján Gudmundsson (Jan, 2019–)

References

External links
 UMF Stjarnan Women Official Website
 UMF Stjarnan Women on Soccerway.com

 
Stjarnan
Capital Region (Iceland)
Association football clubs established in 2012
Úrvalsdeild Women clubs